Labuhan Lombok is a port town in eastern Lombok, Indonesia, 74 kilometres east of the city of Mataram. 

True to the name, which means "Port of Lombok", it is best known as the port for ferries to the neighboring island of Sumbawa. The town is also called Tanjung Kayangan. The port is located to the south of the town and connects with Poto Tano in Sumbawa.

References

External links

Populated places in Lombok